The lineated foliage-gleaner (Syndactyla subalaris) is a species of bird in the family Furnariidae. It is found in Colombia, Costa Rica, Ecuador, Panama, Peru, and Venezuela. Its natural habitat is subtropical or tropical moist montane forest.

References

lineated foliage-gleaner
Birds of Costa Rica
Birds of the Northern Andes
lineated foliage-gleaner
lineated foliage-gleaner
Taxonomy articles created by Polbot